Olsen Pierre (born August 27, 1991) is a former American football defensive end. He played college football at the University of Miami.

Early years
Pierre grew up in Rahway, New Jersey and attended Rahway High School. He was a New York Giants fan during the height of Osi Umenyiora and the beginning of Jason Pierre-Paul’s pass-rushing careers. He admired the “go-getter” approach of Umenyiora, while Jason Pierre Paul like himself, are of Haitian descent which was also impressionable for him early on while pursuing a career in football.

College career
Pierre started 36 of 40 games played at Miami (FL), notching 96 tackles, nine tackles for loss, 2.5 sacks, two forced fumbles, one fumble recovery and six passes defensed.

Professional career

Chicago Bears
Pierre signed with the Chicago Bears as an undrafted free agent following the 2015 NFL Draft. He was released on August 30, 2015.

Arizona Cardinals
Pierre was signed to Cardinals practice squad on October 21, 2015. On January 26, 2016, he was signed to a future contract.

On March 7, 2017, Pierre signed an exclusive rights tender with the Cardinals. On April 18, he signed a one-year contract. On October 1, 2017, he recorded his first career sack against the San Francisco 49ers. On November 9, he made his first career start, getting four tackles and a sack against the Seattle Seahawks. He recorded three more sacks to finish the 2017 season, all three in wins over the Jacksonville Jaguars, Tennessee Titans, and a strip-sack in the season finale against the Seahawks. He ended his season with 30 tackles, 5.5 sacks, 2 passes defensed, and a forced fumble in 14 games.

On April 3, 2018, Pierre re-signed with the Cardinals on a one-year contract. He played in 10 games before being placed on injured reserve on December 4, 2018 with a knee injury.

New York Giants
On March 15, 2019, Pierre was signed by the New York Giants. He was released on November 9.

Oakland Raiders
On December 11, 2019, Pierre was signed by the Oakland Raiders.

References

External links
Miami Hurricanes bio
Arizona Cardinals bio

1991 births
Living people
Sportspeople from Rahway, New Jersey
Players of American football from New Jersey
American sportspeople of Haitian descent
American football defensive tackles
Miami Hurricanes football players
Arizona Cardinals players
New York Giants players
Oakland Raiders players
Rahway High School alumni